Vai Tango Cave is a karst cave located a short distance from Ngatiarua Village, on the island of Mauke in the Cook Islands. The cave is a cenote cave with overhanging stalactites and a deep pool used for swimming. The pool extends more than 100m back and 50m across.

References

Caves of the Cook Islands
Mauke